Wirt Clinton Rowland (December 1, 1878 – November 30, 1946) was an American architect best known for his work in Detroit, Michigan.

Biography

Rowland was born December 1, 1878, in Clinton, Michigan, to Clinton Charles and Melissa Ruth Rowland. In 1901, he landed a job as an office boy for the Detroit firm of Rogers and MacFarlane, quickly moving on to the prestigious George D. Mason firm. In 1909, he joined the office of Albert Kahn Associates, who had also apprenticed under Mason. In 1910, with the encouragement of both Mason and Kahn, Rowland attended the Harvard Graduate School of Design in Cambridge, for a year.

The combination of Rowland's natural design talent, Harvard education, and Detroit's healthy economy positioned him to make major contributions to the city's architecture. Rowland is a case study in design attribution. In 1911, in the office of Kahn, he and Ernest Wilby are said have been primarily responsible for the Hill Auditorium at the University of Michigan. Through 1915, Rowland worked for the local firm of Malcomson & Higginbotham. He then returned to Kahn's office, contributing to the firm's classic projects, namely the Harland Hatcher Graduate Library at the University of Michigan, the Detroit News Building, the First National Building (1922), and the General Motors Building (1922) renamed Cadillac Place.

Rowland's career peaked as Head Designer (1922–1930) of Smith, Hinchman & Grylls (SmithGroup). There, he designed a dozen major structures in downtown Detroit; among these are a number of the city's most accomplished and evocative buildings. To a large extent, Rowland helped define Detroit's architectural genre. Of the Guardian building Rowland said, We no longer live in a leisurely age, . . What we see we must see quickly in passing, and the impression must be immediate, strong, and complete. Color has this vital power. For the Guardian Building, he had assembled a multitude of artisans, mosaicists, sculptors, painters, and tile manufacturers including sculptor Corrado Parducci, muralist Ezra Winter, and tile from the Rookwood and Pewabic pottery companies. He thus recreated the architectural synthesis of a medieval cathedral. Hence, Rowland had reached a climax, when his Union Trust/Guardian Building became known as the Cathedral of Finance.

The Guardian Building opened in 1929. With the onset of the Great Depression, most of the employees of Smith Hinchman & Grylls were let go, including Rowland. In January 1931, he joined in a partnership with his long-time friend, Augustus (Gus) O'Dell. The firm secured a small number of important commissions, including the Victor Vaughan House dormitory at the University of Michigan, Maire Elementary School in Grosse Pointe, and the Mark Twain Branch Library in Detroit, supplemented with reconstruction necessitated by the widening of Woodward Avenue, and by insurance re-valuations of existing buildings.

Beginning in 1935, Rowland was hired by Edwin S. George to design a Gothic cathedral, later known as Kirk in the Hills. The church was to have been constructed on land owned by George adjoining his suburban home in Bloomfield Hills, Michigan, however, the funds available were insufficient to proceed with construction. In 1946, George realized that by incorporating his existing suburban home into the church to house administrative activities, the cost of construction would be greatly reduced. Rowland approved of this revision, but died before he could redraw the plans. The firm of George D. Mason & Co. was hired in 1947 to draw new plans for the church and oversee construction and the church was completed in 1958.

Rowland was a member of the Chandler Park Partnership, a group of nineteen architects and engineers that designed Parkside housing project (1935–1938) in Detroit. During World War II, Rowland was employed by the firm Giffels & Valet in their office at Naval Station Norfolk. Among the structures he designed during that period was the David Adams Memorial Chapel and Our Lady of Victory Chapel in the base chapel building.

Rowland Designed Structures
 T. B. Rayl Company Building (1915) Woodward Avenue, Detroit, Michigan; designed by Rowland for Baxter and O'Dell, featured an early use of colored terra-cotta.

Designs for George D. Mason, 1902 to 1909
 Pontchartrain Hotel (1907), Detroit, Michigan

Designs for Malcomson & Higginbotham, 1912 to 1915
 Northern High School (1915), Detroit, Michigan
 Southeastern High School (1915), Detroit, Michigan
 Isabell F. Thirkell Elementary School (1915), Virginia Park Historic District, Detroit, Michigan
 Northeastern High School (1916), Detroit, Michigan
 Anna M. Joyce School (1916), Detroit, Michigan
 Nordstrum School (1916), Detroit, Michigan
 Harms Elementary School (1917), Detroit, Michigan

Designs for Albert Kahn Associates, 1910, and 1915 to 1922
 Hill Auditorium (with Ernest Wilby) (1913), University of Michigan, Ann Arbor, Michigan
 Harlan Hatcher University of Michigan Library (with Ernest Wilby) (1915–1920), Ann Arbor, Michigan
 Langley Field Hangars and Executive Buildings, including the current Air Combat Command Headquarters Building (1917), Point Comfort, Virginia
 Rockwell Field (now part of Naval Air Station, North Island) Hangars, Guard House, and Officers Homes (1917), Coronado, California 
 General Motors Building (1919-1923), Detroit, Michigan, preliminary work and exterior design
 First National Building (first unit-1922), Detroit, Michigan, preliminary work and exterior design

Designs for Smith, Hinchman & Grylls, 1922 to 1930
 Jefferson Avenue Presbyterian Church (1926), Detroit, Michigan
 Bankers Trust Building (1925), Detroit, Michigan
 Buhl Building (1925), Detroit, Michigan
 Second National Bank Building (1925), Saginaw, Michigan
 George H. Phelps Advertising Building (1925), 2761 E. Jefferson Ave., Detroit, Michigan
 Grand Rapids Trust Building (1926), Grand Rapids, Michigan
 Benjamin Nolan School (1926), 1150 E. Lantz St., Detroit, Michigan
 Michigan Bell Building (1927), Detroit, Michigan, 12-story addition and commercial office updates to original 7-story, 1919 building
 David Mackenzie High School (1927)(demolished), Detroit, Michigan
 Ambassador Bridge (1927-1929) Cable Anchorage Piers, and Terminal Buildings (demolished)
 Michigan Bell Detroit-Columbia Central Office Building, 52 Seldon St., Detroit, Michigan
 Greater Penobscot Building (1928), Detroit, Michigan
 Pontchartrain Club Building/Town Apartments (begun 1928, not completed; later converted to Town Apartments), Detroit, Michigan
 Union Trust/Guardian Building (1929), Detroit, Michigan
 Cunningham Drug Building (1929), 1134 Griswold St., and 25 State St., Detroit, Michigan
 Michigan Bell and Western Electric Warehouse (1930), 82 Oakman Blvd., Detroit, Michigan
 Detroit Saturday Night Building (1929), 1959 E. Jefferson Ave., Detroit, Michigan
 Denby High School (1930), Detroit, Michigan
 Pershing High School (1930), Detroit, Michigan
 Union Industrial Bank Building/Charles Stewart Mott Foundation Building (1930), Flint, Michigan
 Michigan Bell Saginaw Office Building (1930), 309 S. Washington Ave., Saginaw, Michigan

Designs for O'Dell and Rowland, 1931 to 1938
 L. Black Co. store (1932), 1420 Woodward Ave., Detroit, Michigan
 Good Housekeeping Stran-Steel House (1933) for the 1933 Homes of Tomorrow Exhibition at the Century of Progress International Exposition, Chicago, Illinois
 "Ideal Home" for Detroit Builders' Show of 1933, Grosse Pointe Woods, Michigan
 Lewis A. Maire Elementary School (1936), Grosse Pointe, Michigan
 Stevens Memorial Chapel - chancel section, including altar, reredos, and organ screen (1938), St. John's Episcopal Church, Detroit, Michigan
 Victor C. Vaughn House dormitory, University of Michigan (1938), Ann Arbor, Michigan

Notes

References and further reading
Ferry, W. Hawkins (1968). The Buildings of Detroit: A History. Wayne State University Press.

External links
Wirt Clinton Rowland from the Historical Society of Clinton
Jefferson Avenue Presbyterian Church's Architectural Elements

1878 births
1946 deaths
19th-century American architects
Art Deco architects
Harvard Graduate School of Design alumni
20th-century American architects
People from Lenawee County, Michigan
Architects from Michigan